R. K. Mittal is Vice-Chancellor of Chaudhary Bansi Lal University, Bhiwani and has worked as Director-Development  in Guru Gobind Singh Indraprastha University, Delhi. He is former Vice-Chancellor of Teerthanker Mahaveer University, Moradabad, Uttar Pradesh, India.

References

Living people
Academic staff of Guru Gobind Singh Indraprastha University
Place of birth missing (living people)
Year of birth missing (living people)
Heads of universities and colleges in India